The 1948–49 Egyptian Premier League started on 22 October 1948. Al Ahly were crowned champions for the first time in total.

Clubs

League table

Top goalscorers

Al-Ahly Results 

|}

External links
all about Egyptian football
ALL ABOUT EGYTIAN PLAYERS
 egyptianfootball.net
RSSSF
RSSSF competition history
  Egyptian Premier League schedule, match results, and match downloads

4
1948–49 in Egyptian football
1948–49 in African association football leagues